Umm Al Quwain Free Trade Zone  is a free economic zone located in the emirate of Umm Al Quwain, United Arab Emirates. Created under a Ruler's Decree, Umm Al Quwain Free Trade Zone commenced operations in 1987. It functions under the administration of Sheikh Saud Bin Rashid Al Mualla

History

Umm Al Quwain Free Trade Zone (UAQ FTZ) is located in Umm Al Quwain, one of the 7 emirates in the UAE. It is located 45km from Dubai. It is the first and among the biggest free trade zones in UAE. It has a total of 8,000+ registered companies and 20 million sq ft of land for business operations with investors across 150 nationalities. It is a developed Free Zone in Umm Al Quwain which is known for its desert landscape and unique flora and fauna.

UAQ FTZ is situated close to the UAE’s primary sea ports and in close proximity to Dubai International Airport and Sharjah International Airport. It has direct access to UAQ port.

References

Free-trade zones of the United Arab Emirates
Economy of Dubai
Geography of Dubai
Neighbourhoods in the United Arab Emirates